Statistics of Nemzeti Bajnokság I for the 1909–10 season.

Overview
It was contested by 9 teams, and Ferencvárosi TC won the championship.

League standings

Results

References
Hungary - List of final tables (RSSSF)

1909-10
1909–10 in Hungarian football
1909–10 in European association football leagues